Embassy of Japan in New Delhi is the diplomatic mission of the State of Japan to India. Since September 2019, Satoshi Suzuki has been the ambassador.

History 
  On 12 April 1952, prior to the coming independence of Japan, the Japanese National Diet enacted the "Act of Determination of the Names and Locations of the Diplomatic Missions," which stipulates to establish the Embassy in New Delhi.
 On 28 April 1952, Japan became independent due to the entry into force of the Treaty of San Francisco, while India is not a signatory to the treaty; however, the "Act of Determination of the Names and Locations of the Diplomatic Missions" came into effect in Japan.
 On 9 June 1952, the Treaty of Peace Between Japan and India was signed.
 On 27 August 1952, the Japan–India Peace Treaty came into effect with establishment of diplomatic relations between Japan and India, and the Embassy of Japan in New Delhi was officially approved by India.
 In September 1971, Japan granted an implied approval of Bhutan as a sovereign state.
 In March 1986, diplomatic relations between Japan and Bhutan was established.
 Embassy of Japan in New Delhi began to be in charge of the Embassy of Japan to Bhutan.

Address 
Plot No.4 & 5, 50-G Shantipath, Chanakyapuri, New Delhi 110021

Notable officials 
 Otohiko Endo: Komeito Member of the House of Representatives
 Shunichi Kuryu: 27th National Police Agency Commissioner
 Takashi Sakurai: Patent Office Patent Technician
 Kazuo Hanazumi: National Tax College Chief
 Masamichi Saigo: Ministry of Agriculture, Forestry and Fisheries Technical Director

See also 
 India–Japan relations
 List of diplomatic missions in India
 List of diplomatic missions of Japan

References

External links 
 Embassy of Japan, New Delhi
 

Diplomatic missions in India
India–Japan relations
Bhutan–Japan relations
Government agencies established in 1952
Diplomatic missions in New Delhi
Diplomatic missions of Japan